Jerry Sterner (15 September 1938 – 11 June 2001) was an American businessman and playwright, best known for the play Other People's Money.

Born in the Bronx, he sold tokens on the night shift where he wrote several plays. In 1966 he married Jean Sterner. They have two daughters, Emily James and the writer, Kate Shaffar.

In 1980 he left a successful run in the real estate business to become a writer full-time. His early plays include Tit for Tat and Be Happy for Me, starring David Groh, Philip Bosco, and Priscilla Lopez.

His first big success came with Other People's Money which opened at the Minetta Lane Theater in 1989 and ran for several years. It starred Kevin Conway, Mercedes Ruehl, James Murtaugh, Arch Johnson, and Scotty Block.

He worked on several musicals, including one with Jerry Bock, called 1040.

He is buried in Washington Cemetery behind his old building in Brooklyn. His headstone is inscribed sardonically with: "Finally, a plot."

Other works
Be Happy For Me - 1986 Off Broadway play starring David Groh, Philip Bosco and Priscilla Lopez.

References

External links

Be Happy For Me, NYTimes review

2001 deaths
1938 births
20th-century American dramatists and playwrights
Writers from the Bronx
American male dramatists and playwrights
20th-century American male writers